In enzymology, a tRNA-uridine aminocarboxypropyltransferase is an enzyme that catalyzes the chemical reaction

S-adenosyl-L-methionine + tRNA uridine  5'-methylthioadenosine + tRNA 3-(3-amino-3-carboxypropyl)-uridine

Thus, the two substrates of this enzyme are S-adenosyl-L-methionine and tRNA uridine, whereas its two products are 5'-methylthioadenosine and tRNA 3-(3-amino-3-carboxypropyl)-uridine.

This enzyme belongs to the family of transferases, specifically those transferring aryl or alkyl groups other than methyl groups.  The systematic name of this enzyme class is S-adenosyl-L-methionine:tRNA-uridine 3-(3-amino-3-carboxypropyl)transferase.

References

 

EC 2.5.1
Enzymes of unknown structure